Mehdi Leroy (born 18 April 1978) is a French former professional footballer who played as a midfielder.

Leroy helped Troyes become one of the winners of the 2001 UEFA Intertoto Cup. In the final Troyes beat Newcastle United on away goals after the second leg finished 4–4 at St James' Park; Leroy scored one of Troyes' goals. He also played as a substitute when Nantes won the 1999 Trophée des Champions.

Honours
Nantes
Trophée des Champions: 1999

Troyes
UEFA Intertoto Cup: 2001

References

External links
 
 
 Profile at foot-national.com

1978 births
Living people
Sportspeople from Saint-Nazaire
Association football midfielders
French footballers
FC Nantes players
Ligue 1 players
ES Troyes AC players
Amiens SC players
Ligue 2 players
Stade Lavallois players
Paris FC players
Vannes OC players
SO Cholet players
Footballers from Loire-Atlantique